Andrey Yuryevich Belyaninov (in , born July 14, 1957) is a Russian businessman and government official. He is a Chairman of the Eurasian Development Bank since 2017. Belyaninov graduated from Moscow Plekhanov Academy of National Economy and holds a Doctorate in Economics.

Biography
As a child, he starred in Eugene Karelov "Children of Don Quixote"
Belyaninov graduated from the Moscow Plekhanov Academy of National Economy in 1978. After graduation he worked in the First Main Directorate of the KGB in East Germany. He was also a financial expert at the REA bank and chairman of Novikombank.

Career

1978–1991 he worked for the KGB.
1992–1999 he worked as a banker in several Russian banks.
1999-2000 he was the Deputy Economy General Director of Federal State Unitary Enterprise Promexport.
2000–2004 he was the Director General of Rosoboronexport.
2004-2006 he was the Director of the Federal Service for Defence Contracts.
2006-2016 he was the Head of the Federal Customs Service of Russia.

Awards

Order of Friendship (Орден Дружбы)
Certificate of Merit from the Government of the Russian Federation (2 November 2009) - for achievements in implementing the state customs policy and years of hard work

References

1957 births
Living people
Businesspeople from Moscow
Russian politicians
Russian bankers
KGB officers
Soviet male child actors
Plekhanov Russian University of Economics alumni
Recipients of the Order of Saint Righteous Grand Duke Dmitry Donskoy, 3rd class